Serra do Areão Airport  is the airport serving the district of Monte Dourado in Almeirim, Brazil.

History
The airport was built as a support facility to Jari project.

Airlines and destinations

Access

See also

List of airports in Brazil

References

External links

Airports in Pará